The Volcanic Seven Summits are the highest volcanoes on each of the seven continents, just as the Seven Summits are the highest peaks on each of the seven continents. Summiting all seven is regarded as a mountaineering challenge, first postulated as such in 1999.

Two of the Volcanic Seven Summits are also in the Seven Summits list. Mount Kilimanjaro and Mount Elbrus, which were formed volcanically, are the highest peaks of their respective continents.

Definitions
Due to different interpretations of continental borders (geological, geographical, geopolitical) several definitions for the highest summits per continent and the number of continents are possible. The number of seven continents used here is based on the continent model used in Western Europe and the United States.

An additional complication in determining the highest volcanic summits is defining exactly what constitutes a volcano and how much topographic prominence it must have relative to any nearby non-volcanic peaks in order to qualify. For the purposes of this list, the summits must be an actual eruptive volcanic center, not merely made of volcanic rocks which were uplifted by other geological processes. In addition, a topographic prominence of at least  is required, so that the list includes only genuine volcanic mountains and not minor outpourings of lava which happened to leak to the Earth's surface in high-altitude regions (see Asia below).

Africa, North America, Antarctica
No serious dispute exists as to the highest volcanoes in Africa, North America, and Antarctica—respectively, Kilimanjaro, Pico de Orizaba, and Mount Sidley.

Australia
Although there are a few minor and inactive volcanoes on the Australian mainland, this list recognizes that the island of New Guinea is part of the Australian continent.  Numerous scientific papers written in the 1970s and 1980s confirm that Mount Giluwe in Papua New Guinea is in fact an old eroded volcano,
unlike the higher mountains of New Guinea which are all non-volcanic in origin.

Even if this continent is defined instead as Oceania (thus adding New Zealand and Polynesia including Hawaii), Giluwe remains the highest volcano since it exceeds the elevation of Mauna Kea in Hawaii and any volcano in New Zealand.

Europe
The generally accepted geographical border between Europe and Asia runs along the crest of the Ural Mountains in central Russia and of the Caucasus along the southern border of Russia.  Since the massive twin-peaked stratovolcano of Mount Elbrus rises just north of the crest, it is the highest summit in Europe and also the highest volcano.

Some geologists, though, consider the Kuma-Manych depression as the geological border between Asia and Europe. Such definition would render Elbrus entirely in Asia, making it the highest volcano of that continent (see below) and making Mount Etna (a 3350-metre active stratovolcano in Sicily, Italy) the highest volcano in Europe. Mount Teide in the Canary Islands, while active, taller than Etna and within the territory of a European country, would not be considered because geologically the Canaries belong to the African continent.

South America
Although Aconcagua, the highest peak in South America and the highest peak in the western hemisphere, does have a volcanic origin, its current high point is due to geological processes rather than being strictly volcanic.  Due to this, Aconcagua is not considered to be a volcano on its own, at least not as a member of Volcanic Seven Summits.

Topographic maps of the Argentina and Chile border region which contains the highest peaks suffer from poor accuracy, with elevation errors exceeding  in many cases. However, the current consensus based on the most recent measurements places Ojos del Salado as the 2nd highest peak and highest volcano in South America, significantly higher than Monte Pissis.

Asia

There are more than 70 volcanic vents known as the Kunlun Volcanic Group in Tibet at higher elevations than Damavand's summit, the highest of which has a reported elevation of  (35.5°N 80.2°E). Peaks in this volcanic group are not considered volcanic mountains but instead a type of pyroclastic cone. Information about these cones is extremely scarce and the listed elevations and prominences is of unknown accuracy and reliability. The volcanoes in the list below all have prominences far exceeding that threshold.

Volcanic Seven Summits

Note: Two of the Volcanic Seven Summits, Kilimanjaro and Elbrus, are also members of the Seven Summits. Ojos del Salado is also a member of the Seven Second Summits.

Volcanic Seven Second Summits

Defining the second highest volcanoes on each continent is a bit more complicated, because the continental definitions become critical.

The problem between Australia and Oceania: Mount Hagen in Papua New Guinea is certainly the second highest volcano on the Australian continent, but expanding the continental definition to span also the broad definition of Oceania drops Hagen to 4th behind Mauna Kea and Mauna Loa on the Island of Hawaii.

In Europe, Kazbek is the second highest volcano. It lies on the border of Russia and Georgia, whose European status is sometimes disputed, although Kazbek lies entirely on the European side of the Caucasus watershed. The Terek River rises to the south and west of Kazbek but drains northwards to Russia.

All variant definitions are listed in the table below, so there are eight volcanoes included:

 Mount Kenya is also a member of the Seven Second Summits.
 Territory claimed by New Zealand. However, most nations do not recognize Antarctic territorial claims.

Mountaineering challenge

History
In 2011, Mario Trimeri became the first person to summit all 12 (Mount Kilimanjaro and Mount Elbrus are on both lists) of the Volcanic Seven Summits and the Seven Summits. Indian climber Satyarup Siddhanta made a Guinness World Record  and became the youngest mountaineer in the world  to complete both the Seven Summits and the Seven Volcanic Summits at the age of 35 years 262 days  when he scaled Mount Sidley  in Antarctica on 16 January 2019, surpassing Australian mountaineer Daniel Bull who had previously made this record at the age of 36 years 157 days.  On 9 December 2018 after scaling Ojos del Salado, Canadian climber Theodore Fairhurst became the oldest in the world to complete both the Seven Summits and Volcanic Seven Summits climbing challenge at 71 years and 231 days.

See also 
 Explorers Grand Slam, also known as The Adventurers Grand Slam
 Seven Summits
 Seven Second Summits

References

 
.
Peak bagging
Volcanoes